The Planners Are Coming is a British fly on the wall documentary television series broadcast on BBC One in 2008 and 2009. It follows council Planning Officers and Enforcement Officers as they dealt with planning applications and enforced planning regulations in cases where planning permission had not been sought.

Council planning departments featured in the programme include those of Braintree in Essex and Barking & Dagenham, Barnet and Brent in London.

In 2008, the first four episodes were shown in an 8pm slot, with the remaining four episodes airing in 2009 at the later time of 10:35pm. The series has also been broadcast on The LifeStyle Channel in Australia.

When the programme was first announced by the BBC in June 2007, the working title was The Planners, but this was later changed to The Planners Are Coming. In 2013, a similar documentary series called The Planners aired on BBC Two and in 2014 a new series called Permission Impossible: Britain's Planners began on BBC Two.

Episodes

See also
 Permission Impossible: Britain's Planners 
 The Planners

References

External links

2008 British television series debuts
2009 British television series endings
BBC television documentaries
Television series by Banijay
Town and country planning in the United Kingdom